The Academia Brasileira de Letras (ABL) ( English: Brazilian Academy of Letters) is a Brazilian literary non-profit society established at the end of the 19th century. The first president, Machado de Assis, declared its foundation on Tuesday, 15 December 1896, with the by-laws being passed on Thursday, 28 January 1897. On Tuesday, 20 July of the same year, the academy started its operation.

According to its statutes, it is the pre-eminent Portuguese council for matters pertaining to the Portuguese language. The ABL is considered the foremost institution devoted to the Portuguese language in Brazil. Its prestige and technical qualification gives it paramount authority in Brazilian Portuguese, even though it is not a public institution and no law grants it oversight over the language. The academy's main publication in this field is the Orthographic Vocabulary of the Portuguese Language (Vocabulário Ortográfico da Língua Portuguesa) which has five editions. The Vocabulary is prepared by the academy's Commission on Lexicology and Lexicography. If a word is not included in the Vocabulary, it is considered not to exist as a correct word in Brazilian Portuguese.

Since its beginning and to this day, the academy is composed of 40 members, known as the "immortals". These members are chosen from among citizens of Brazil who have published works or books with recognized literary value. The position of "immortal" is awarded for the lifetime. New members are admitted by a vote of the academy members when one of the "chairs" become vacant. The chairs are numbered and each has a Patron: the Patrons are 40 great Brazilian writers that were already dead when the ABL was founded; the names of the Patrons were chosen by the Founders as to honour them post mortem by assigning patronage over a chair. Thus, each chair is associated with its current holder, her or his predecessors, the original Founder who occupied it in the first place, and also with a Patron.

The academicians use formal gala gilded uniforms with a sword (the uniform is called "fardão") when participating in official meetings at the academy. The body has the task of acting as an official authority on the language; it is charged with publishing an official dictionary of the language. Its rulings, however, are not binding on either the public or the government.

History

Foundation
The statuses of the Brazilian Academy of Letters and the membership of the 40 founding fathers were approved at these meetings, on 28 January 1897. On 20 July of the same year, the inaugural session was held at the Pedagogium'''s facility in the centre of Rio de Janeiro.

Without appointed headquarters or financial resources, the solemn meetings of the academy were held at the hall of the Royal Portuguese Cabinet of Reading, at the premises of the former National Gymnasium and at the Noble Hall of the Ministry of the Interior. The joint sessions were held at the law firm of Rodrigo Octávio, the ABL's first secretary's, at Quitanda Street, 47.

In 1904, the academy obtained the left wing of the Brazilian Silogeo, a governmental building that housed other cultural institutions. It remained there until moving to its own headquarters in 1923.

Petit Trianon

In 1923, thanks to the initiative of its president at the time, Afrânio Peixoto and of the then-French ambassador, Raymond Conty, the French government donated the French Pavilion building to the Academy. The building had been built for the Independence of Brazil's Centenary International Exposition by the architect Ange-Jacques Gabriel, between 1762 and 1768 and was a replica of the Petit Trianon of Versailles.

These facilities have been inscribed as Brazilian Cultural heritage since Monday, 9 November 1987, by the State Institute of Cultural Heritage (INEPAC), of the Municipal Secretary of Culture of Rio de Janeiro. To the present day, its halls continue to host regular meetings, solemn sessions, commemorative meetings and inauguration sessions of the new academics, as well as the traditional Thursdays' tea. They are also open to the public for guided tours or for special cultural programs, such as chamber music concerts, book launches, conference cycles and theatre plays.

In the buildings' first floor hall stands the decorated marble floor, a French crystal chandelier, a large white porcelain vase from Sèvres and four English bas-reliefs. Inside the building, the following premises stand out:

 the Noble Hall, where the solemn sessions take place;
 the French Hall, where the new members traditionally remain alone, in reflection;
 the  Room, where an oil painting on canvas of a collective of nineteenth-century writers and intellectuals, by the painter Rodolfo Amoedo, is depicted;
 the Hall of the Founders, decorated with period furniture and paintings by Candido Portinari;
 the Machado de Assis Room, decorated with the writer's desk, books and personal belongings, such as portrait by painter Henrique Bernardelli;
 the Hall of Romantic Poets, which holds bronze busts of Castro Alves, Fagundes Varela, Gonçalves Dias, Casimiro de Abreu and Álvares de Azevedo, by Brazilian-Mexican sculptor Rodolfo Bernardelli.

On the second floor, one can find the Sessions Room, the Library the Tea Room. The Tea Room is the academics' meeting point before the Plenary Session, on Thursdays. The Library is used by scholars and researchers and holds a collection of Manuel Bandeira.

Dictatorship

During periods like the Vargas' totalitarian dictatorship or the Brazilian military government, the academy's neutrality in choosing proper members dedicated to the literary profession was compromised with the election of politicians with few or no contributions to literature, such as ex-president and dictator Getúlio Vargas in 1943. The Academy is also accused of not having defended culture expression and freedom of speech during both Vargas' Era and during the Military dictatorship. Both of these ruling periods imposed heavy censorship on Brazilian culture, including Brazilian literature.

Characteristic
According to its statutes, the Academy aims to promote the "culture of the national language". It comprises 40 effective and perpetual members, known as "immortals". These members are Brazilian citizens with published works of relevant literary value. Besides these members, the ABL also comprises 20 correspondent members.

All members go through a solemn session, in which dress the Academy's official garment for the first time. During the ceremony, the new member makes a speech remembering her or his predecessor and all previous members that occupied the chair.

The ABL, which was a traditionally male institution, elected its first female member on Friday, 4 November 1977 – the novelist Rachel de Queiroz. This groundbreaking election of the novelist opened the path for other female members. The academy now accounts for four women members (10% of its total membership), one of which, Nélida Piñon, served as president in 1996–97.

Nowadays

Thanks to revenues over $ 4 million a year, the academy is financially stable. It owns a skyscraper with 28 floors (Palácio Austregésilo de Athayde) in the centre of Rio, which the academy rents for office space, generating 70% of its current revenue. The rest comes from rental of other buildings, which were inherited from book editor , in 1917, and from other financial investments. This comfortable situation allows the payment of a "jeton" to each academician.

The academy annually awards several literary prizes: 
 the Prêmio Machado de Assis, the most important literature prize in the country, awarded for lifework;
 the ABL prizes for poetry, fiction, drama, essays, history of the literature and for children's literature;
 the José Lins do Rego prize, an extraordinary commemorative prize awarded in 2001
 the Afonso Arinos prize, an extraordinary commemorative prize awarded in 2005.

The academy also publishes a literary periodical, the Brazilian Review (Revista Brasileira), with quarterly editions.

Orthographic Vocabulary

The academy's main publication in this field is the Orthographic Vocabulary of the Portuguese Language (Vocabulário Ortográfico da Língua Portuguesa) of which there are five editions. The Vocabulary is prepared by the ABL's Commission on Lexicology and Lexicography. If a word is not included in the Vocabulary, it is considered not to exist as a correct word in Brazilian Portuguese.

The Orthographic Vocabulary, however, is not a dictionary, as it contains words and their grammatical categories, but not the definition or meaning of the words listed. Thus, unlike the French Academy, the Royal Spanish Academy and other foreign institutions dedicated to the care of a national language, the Brazilian Academy of Letters hasn't published an official dictionary. It has, however, published a School Dictionary of the Portuguese Language (Dicionário Escolar da Língua Portuguesa), with students as its target customers, in 2009.

The ABL does plan to publish a full and official Dictionary. For the time being, however, other dictionaries such as the Aurélio and the Houaiss remain more prestigious than the School Dictionary, in spite of the fact that the latter is sometimes marketed by booksellers as the "ABL's Dictionary", due to its being authored by the academy. Both the Houaiss and the Aurélio Dictionaries, however, were first compiled by members of the academy Antônio Houaiss and Aurélio Buarque de Holanda Ferreira, respectively. The preparation of an official dictionary of the Portuguese language is a stated goal of the Brazilian Academy of Letters.

Members
Original patrons

 Adelino Fontoura
 Álvares de Azevedo
 Artur de Oliveira
 Basílio da Gama
 Bernardo Guimarães
 Casimiro de Abreu
 Castro Alves
 Cláudio Manuel da Costa
 Gonçalves de Magalhães
 Evaristo da Veiga
 Fagundes Varela
 França Júnior
 Francisco Otaviano
 Franklin Távora
 Gonçalves Dias
 Gregório de Matos
 Hipólito da Costa
 João Francisco Lisboa
 Joaquim Caetano da Silva
 Joaquim Manuel de Macedo
 Joaquim Serra
 José Bonifácio the Younger
 José de Alencar
 Júlio Ribeiro
 Junqueira Freire
 Laurindo Rabelo
 Antônio Peregrino Maciel Monteiro
 Manuel Antônio de Almeida
 Martins Pena
 Pardal Mallet
 Pedro Luís Pereira de Sousa
 Manuel de Araújo Porto-Alegre
 Raul Pompeia
 Sousa Caldas
 Tavares Bastos
 Teófilo Dias
 Tomás António Gonzaga
 Tobias Barreto
 Francisco Adolfo de Varnhagen
 José Maria da Silva Paranhos Sr.

Correspondents

 Alexandre de Gusmão
 António José da Silva
 Manuel Botelho de Oliveira
 Eusébio de Matos
 Francisco de Sousa
 Matias Aires
 Nuno Marques Pereira
 Sebastião da Rocha Pita
 Santa Rita Durão
 Vicente do Salvador
 Alexandre Rodrigues Ferreira
 Antônio de Morais Silva
 Domingos Borges de Barros
 Francisco do Monte Alverne
 Joaquim Gonçalves Ledo
 José Bonifácio de Andrada e Silva
 Odorico Mendes
 Manuel Inácio da Silva Alvarenga
 Sotero dos Reis
 José da Silva Lisboa

Presidents

 Joaquim Maria Machado de Assis 1897–1908
 Ruy Barbosa 1908–1919
 Domício da Gama 1919
 Carlos de Laet 1919–1922
 Afrânio Peixoto 1922–1923
 Medeiros e Albuquerque 1923
 Afrânio Peixoto 1923–1924
 Afonso Celso de Assis Figueiredo Júnior 1925
 Coelho Neto 1926
 Rodrigo Otávio 1927
 Augusto de Lima 1928
 Fernando Magalhães 1929
 Aloisio de Castro 1930
 Fernando Magalhães 1931–1932
 Gustavo Barroso 1932–1933
 Ramiz Galvão 1933–1934
 Afonso Celso de Assis Figueiredo Júnior 1935
 Laudelino Freire 1936
 Ataulfo de Paiva 1937
 Cláudio de Souza 1938
 Antônio Austregésilo 1939
 Celso Vieira 1940
 Levi Carneiro 1941
 Macedo Sorares 1942–1943
 Múcio Leão 1944
 Pedro Calmon 1945
 Cláudio de Sousa 1946
 João Neves da Fontoura 1947
 Adelmar Tavares 1948
 Miguel Osório de Almeida 1949
 Gustavo Barroso 1950-1950
 Aloisio de Castro 1951
 Aníbal Freire da Fonseca 1952
 Barbosa Lima Sobrinho 1953–1954
 Rodrigo Otávio Filho 1955
 Peregrino Júnior 1956–1957
 Elmano Cardim 1958
 Austregésilo de Athayde 1959–1993
 Abgar Renault 1993
 Josué Montello 1993–1995
 Antônio Houaiss 1995–1996
 Nélida Piñon 1996–1997
 Arnaldo Niskier 1997–1999
 Tarcísio Padilha 2000–2002
 Alberto da Costa e Silva 2002–2004
 Ivan Junqueira 2004–2005
 Marcos Vinícios Rodrigues Vilaça 2006–2007
 Cícero Sandroni 2008

Current members
The members of the Brazilian Academy of Letters (June 2019):

 Ana Maria Machado
 Vacant Joaquim Falcão 
 Carlos Nejar
 José Murilo de Carvalho
 Cícero Sandroni
 Cacá Diegues
 Cleonice Berardinelli
 Alberto da Costa e Silva
 Rosiska Darcy
 Ignácio de Loyola Brandão
 Paulo Niemeyer Filho
 Sérgio Paulo Rouanet
 Celso Lafer
 Marco Lucchesi
 Vacant Fernanda Montenegro
 Arnaldo Niskier
 Antônio Carlos Secchin
 Gilberto Gil
 Paulo Coelho
 João Almino
 Antônio Torres
 Geraldo Carneiro
 Alberto Venancio Filho
 Marcos Vilaça
 Antonio Cícero
 Domício Proença Filho
 Geraldo Holanda Cavalcanti
 Nélida Piñon
 Merval Pereira
 Zuenir Ventura
 Evanildo Bechara
 Evaldo Cabral de Mello
 Vacant''
 Fernando Henrique Cardoso
 Arno Wehling
 José Sarney
 José Paulo Cavalcanti Filho
 Edmar Bacha

Gallery of the Immortals
 Machado de Assis
 Jorge Amado
 José Guilherme Merquior
 Tobias Barreto
 Zélia Gattai

See also
 List of members of the Brazilian Academy of Letters
 Lisbon Academy of Sciences
 Academia das Ciências de Lisboa, Classe de Letras
Sociedade Partenon Literário

References

External links
 Academia Brasileira de Letras 

Portuguese language academies
Brazilian literature
 
Academy of Letters
Organizations established in 1896
1896 establishments in Brazil
Organisations based in Rio de Janeiro (city)
Language regulators